Dale Murphy (born 4 September 1959) is a former Australian rules footballer who played with South Melbourne in the Victorian Football League (VFL).

Notes

External links 

Living people
1959 births
Australian rules footballers from Victoria (Australia)
Sydney Swans players